The Holy Confucian Church or Holy Church of Confucius (孔圣会 Kǒngshènghuì) or Holy Confucian Church of China (中华孔圣会 Zhōnghuá Kǒngshènghuì) is a religious organisation of Confucianism in China, formed by local Confucian churches or halls (孔圣堂 Kǒngshèngtáng). A grassroots movement of local Confucian churches was initiated in 2009 by Zhou Beichen, a disciple of the Confucian philosopher Jiang Qing, when he founded the first church in Shenzhen, The aim was to develop a network of local Confucian churches throughout the country, later to be unified into a national body and possibly become a state religion in China. The national and international body, the Holy Confucian Church of China, was established in late 2015.

History
Zhou Beichen was born in the province of Guizhou in 1965. He studied at the Guizhou University and had work experiences in journalism, publishing and teaching. In the 1980s he was interested in Western philosophy, while in the 1990s he studied the works of many contemporary Neo-Confucian circles.

Later, Zhou Beichen approached to Jiang Qing's work on the Gongyang (公羊) school of New Text Confucianism, especially the idea of political Confucianism or the "outer kingship" (外王). In 1996 he met Jiang Qing in person and they founded together the Yangming Academy in Guizhou. Between that year and 2003 he settled down in Shenzhen, making a living with business activity and planning a movement of Confucian holy halls (Kongshengtang), the first of which was eventually founded in 2009. In 2010 it was officially registered as a non-governmental and non-profit (fēi qǐyè 非企业) organisation of public interest (gōngyì 公益), affiliated with the Federation of Confucian Culture of Qufu City. It received support from the Confucian Academy of Hong Kong, although they have remained independent from one another. It also maintained close relations with the Shenzhen local government, and high-ranking dignitaries of the State Administration for Religious Affairs (alias, the United Front Work Department of the Chinese Communist Party) attended its ceremonies.

Other Confucian groups blossomed across China over the following years, so that on 1 November 2015 a committee of Confucian scholars, including Jiang Qing, Kang Xiaoguang, Zhang Xianglong and Sheng Hong amongst others, gathered in Shenzhen for the formal establishment of a national and international Holy Confucian Church, based in China but facing the whole world, which would encompass all local Confucian congregations and civil organisations. Jiang Qing was appointed as the spiritual leader of the church.

Some Confucian scholars saw the Holy Confucian Church as a continuation of the Confucian Church that was founded in 1912 by Kang Youwei, a Confucian reformer, but which was later disbanded because of the hostile political climate at that time. The contemporary Holy Confucian Church aims to foster folk Confucian and traditional religion in a period of deep crisis of the Chinese civilisation, and to represent a "body" for the "soul" of the Chinese, or a new embodiment of the "wandering soul" of Confucianism, which was bereft of its social organisation when the Chinese empire collapsed and the transformation of society thenceforth led to a loss of importance of Confucian temples, academies and ancestral shrines in the life of the Chinese.

Besides the promotion of traditional Chinese culture, the church's constitution also mentions the aim of maintaining the "religious ecology" (宗教生态 zōngjiào shēngtài) of Chinese society through the absorption and reinterpretation of foreign and heterodox religions into Confucianism.

Structure
The Holy Confucian Church is highly structured, both in its doctrine of the faith and in its social organisation. The reference to its "holiness" in its name means that the church reflects the sacred order of nature reflected in Tian (天, "Heaven") and ancestral ties, both of which are objects of worship. Its local congregations (孔圣堂 Kǒngshèngtáng) are at the same times schools and temples (学庙和一 xué miào hé yī) for the education of the individuals and the moral reconstitution of society, that is to say, the filial way (孝慈之道 xiàocí zhī dào) and spiritual home (精神家园 jīngshén jiāyuán) of Chinese life. Its worship halls are called dàochǎng (道场 "place of the way"), a term for halls where doctrines are preached to the disciples.

Economy
The Holy Confucian Church is related to the Sanhe Ren'ai Cultural Foundation, the Shenzhen branch of the Sanhe International Group, headed by Zhang Hua. The foundation's purpose is the promotion of various forms of Confucianism, and it was established in 2013 with the endorsement of Gao Zhanxiang of Chinese Ministry of Culture and the care of the municipal government of Shenzhen and of the local comittee of the United Front Work Department of the Chinese Communist Party. Zhang Hua was the chairman of the church's administrative council at the time of its establishment.

In order to develop independently from the support of unrelated sponsors, in 2010 the first local Confucian church established by Zhou Beichen in Shenzhen adopted a "sustainable development model", also termed the "Shenzhen model". The policy implies the self-support of the church through wedding and funeral rites, and through schools of "Confucian corporate culture" for business companies. The goal of the church is to provide non-profit services, and it offers education, rituals and other activities which are free of charge. The nationwide Holy Confucian Church established in 2015 aims to replicate the Shenzhen model all over China and abroad, and to form missionary institutes, community-oriented lecture circuits and Confucian schools. These objectives are financed by integrated social donations and funding members, contributions from local government for public services at Temples of Confucius, the church's own industrial platform, and other resources.

Founding members
Scholarly commission
 Chairman: Jiang Qing, Yangming Confucian Abode (阳明精舍 Yángmíng jīngshě);
 Vice-chairman: Chen Ming, editor of Yuán dào (《原道》), professor and director of the Research Center on Confucianism of the Capital Normal University;
 Members:
 Zhang Xianglong, professor of Philosophy and Social Development at Shandong University;
 Zhang Xinmin, professor and honorary president of Chinese Culture Academy of Guizhou University;
 Huang Kaiguo, professor of Church and State Relations at Sichuan Normal University;
 Hu Zhihong, professor of the Traditional Chinese Culture Research Center of Wuhan University;
 Li Jinglin, professor of philosophy at Beijing Normal University;
 Chen Zhaoying, professor of Chinese at Taiwan National Central University;
 Sheng Hong, professor of the Center for Economic Research of Shandong University;
 Lin Wu, professor of the Institute of Religion and Culture at Taiwan Tzu Chi University;
 Zhou Chi Cheng, professor of Politics and Administration at South China Normal University;
 Yang Chaoming, professor and president of China Confucius Research Institute;
 Kang Xiaoguang, professor of the School of Public Administration and director of the Institute of Non-Profit Organizations of the Renmin University of China;
 Guo Yi, tenured professor of the Department of Philosophy of Seoul National University (Korea);
 Fan Ruiping, professor of Public Policy at City University of Hong Kong;
 Fang Zhaohui, professor of History at Tsinghua University;
 Wang Ruichang, professor at Capital University of Economics and Business;
 Yaozhong Qiu, professor of the Institute for Advanced Study of Humanities and Social Sciences of Beijing University of Aeronautics and Astronautics;
 Zhang Wanlin, professor of philosophy at Hunan University of Science and Technology;
 Peng Yongjie, professor of the Confucius Research Institute of Renmin University of China;
 Ceng Yi, professor at Tongji University's College of Humanities;
 Bai Tongdong, professor at the School of Philosophy at Fudan University;
 Tang Wenming, professor of philosophy at Tsinghua University;
 Chen Jinguo, research fellow of Contemporary Religion at the Institute of World Religions of the Chinese Academy of Social Sciences;
 Guo Xiaodong, professor at the School of Philosophy of Fudan University;
 Chen Yun, professor of philosophy at East China Normal University;
 Ke Xiaogang, professor of Humanities at Tongji University;
 Chen Yong, professor at the Center for Asian and African Studies at El Colegio de México;

Others Zhu Tong, Li Wenming

Council
 Chairman: Zhang Hua, director of the Sanhe International Group and of its Shenzhen branch, the Sanhe Renai Cultural Foundation;
 Director-general: Zhou Beichen, leader of Shenzhen Holy Confucian Church and president of the Confucian Cultural Exchange Center;
 Board of directors: Hu Huiyin, Kong Xiangdong (secretary-general of the World Association of Descendants of Confucius), Yang Ruqing (dean of Beijing Weihang Academy), Li Zheng, Ji Junchun, Di Jiwen, Wei Zhangzhou, Long Zhouwei (vice-president of Qufu Federation of Confucian Culture), Fan Fei, Chen Shiqiao (Fuding Confucian Practice Research Association), Meng Xiandong, Yuan Yan (president of Guangzhou branch of Minglun Academy), Wang Yi, Yi Zhijun (director of Nanchang Filial Modesty Traditional Cultural Center), Cai Dinghuang (executive director of Nanchang Morality Association), Li Liangshui (secretary-general of Guangdong Academy of National Learning).

See also
 Confucian church

References

Sources
 
 

Confucianism in China
Religious organizations established in 2009
Religious organizations established in 2015
Religious organizations based in China
Confucian organizations
Religious Confucianism